The 2021–22 Long Beach State Beach men's basketball team represented California State University, Long Beach in the 2021–22 NCAA Division I men's basketball season. The Beach were led by 15th-year head coach Dan Monson and played their home games at the Walter Pyramid as members of the Big West Conference. They finished the regular season 20–12, 12–3 in Big West play to win the regular season championship, the school's first since 2013 and fourth overall under Monson. They defeated Cal State Bakersfield and UC Santa Barbara to advance to the championship game of the Big West tournament where they lost to Cal State Fullerton. As a regular season champion that did not win its conference tournament, they received an automatic bid to the National Invitation Tournament, losing in the first round at BYU.

Previous season
In a season limited due to the ongoing COVID-19 pandemic, the Beach finished the season 6–12, 4–8 in Big West play to finish in ninth place. They defeated Cal State Northridge in the first round of the Big West tournament before losing to UC Santa Barbara in the quarterfinals.

Roster

Schedule and results
On December 8, 2021, freshman Aboubacar Traoré posted 20 rebounds in a 102–69 non-conference win over Bethesda of the NCCAA, thus becoming the first LBSU player with that many boards in a single game since 1983.

|-
!colspan=12 style=""| Exhibition

|-
!colspan=12 style=""| Non-conference regular season

|-
!colspan=12 style=""| Big West regular season

|-
!colspan=12 style=""| Big West tournament

|-

|-
 
|-
!colspan=12 style=""| NIT

Source

References

Long Beach State
Long Beach State Beach men's basketball seasons
Long Beach State
Long Beach State
Long Beach State